Crosby Beach is an unincorporated community in Irondale Township, Crow Wing County, Minnesota, United States, near Crosby.

References

Unincorporated communities in Crow Wing County, Minnesota
Unincorporated communities in Minnesota